Urgel "Slim" Wintermute (born July 9, 1917 – presumed dead October 1977) was an American collegiate and professional basketball player.

Collegiate career
Born in Portland, Oregon, Wintermute attended high school in Longview, Washington. A mobile  center, Wintermute was a key member of the 1938–39 Oregon Ducks men's basketball team, winners of the first NCAA Tournament championship. Wintermute was voted first-team All-Pacific Coast Conference and named an All-American in 1939. He was elected to the University of Oregon Athletic Hall of Fame in 1994 and is one of six Ducks whose numbers have been retired.

Professional career
Wintermute played professionally for the Detroit Eagles of the National Basketball League. He also served as player/coach for the Portland Indians of the Pacific Coast Professional Basketball League.

After basketball
Following his basketball career, Wintermute worked for Boeing. He was elected to the Oregon Sports Hall of Fame in 1980. On October 21, 1977, Wintermute set out in his yacht from Portage Bay in Seattle's Lake Union and did not return. His boat was found a few days later, with one of Wintermute's friends asleep on the boat who claimed that Slim was still alive when he went to sleep. Wintermute was never found.

See also
List of people who disappeared at sea

References

1917 births
1970s missing person cases
1977 deaths
All-American college men's basketball players
American men's basketball players
Basketball players from Washington (state)
Centers (basketball)
Detroit Eagles players
Missing people
Missing person cases in Washington (state)
Oregon Ducks men's basketball players
People from Longview, Washington
Basketball players from Portland, Oregon
People lost at sea